NGC 1134 is a spiral galaxy in the Aries constellation. It has a highly inclined disk, with respect to the line of sight from Earth. There is a weak outer extension of the spiral structure in this galaxy. It has been listed in the Arp Atlas of Peculiar Galaxies (Arp number 200), under the "Galaxies with material ejected from nuclei" section. NGC 1134 is classified as a galaxy with reduced surface brightness, and it possesses a distinct bulge in its centre, as judged by photometric analysis. It has a small and distant companion about 7' to the south.

References

External links
 NGC 1134
 Image NGC 1134

Aries (constellation)
1134
02365
200
10928
10928
Spiral galaxies